The Church of Jesus Christ of Latter-day Saints in Wyoming refers to the Church of Jesus Christ of Latter-day Saints (LDS Church) and its members in Wyoming. The church's first congregation in Wyoming was organized in 1877. It has since grown to 67,454 members in 172 congregations.

Official church membership as a percentage of general population was 11.5% in 2014 which is the third highest in the United States, behind Utah and Idaho. According to the 2014 Pew Forum on Religion & Public Life survey, 9% of Wyomingites self-identify themselves most closely with the LDS Church. The LDS Church is the largest denomination in Wyoming.

Stakes are located in Afton, Casper (2), Cheyenne (2), Cody, Evanston (2), Gillette, Green River, Kemmerer, Laramie, Lovell, Lyman, Riverton, Rock Springs, Sheridan, Thayne and Worland.

The Wyoming Mormon Trail Mission was created in 2015 to cover church historical sites in the area, but the mission was discontinued in 2021.

History

The Willie and Martin handcart companies of 1857 became trapped in the winter snows and approximately 200 of the 1,075 in the companies died, but others were saved by Utah rescue parties.

In 1877, members settled the Star Valley area, and in 1878, Brigham Young dedicated the spot as a gathering place for members.

County Statistics
List of LDS Church adherents in each county as of 2010 according to the Association of Religion Data Archives:

Stakes

As of February 2023, Wyoming was home to the following stakes:

Missions
Colorado Fort Collins Mission
Idaho Idaho Falls Mission
Montana Billings Mission
Utah Salt Lake City Mission

Temples

On October 1, 2011, the Star Valley Wyoming Temple was announced by church president Thomas S. Monson. A second temple to built in Casper was announced on April 4, 2021, by Russell M. Nelson. Nelson announced a third temple, to be built in Cody, on October 3, 2021.

Communities 

Latter-day Saints had a significant role in establishing and settling several communities within the "Mormon Corridor", including the following in Wyoming:

Afton
Auburn
Bridger Valley
Rock Springs
Star Valley

See also

 Wyoming: Religion
 Bear River
 Devil's Gate
 Fort Bridger
 Fort Laramie
 Green River
 Independence Rock
 Lincoln County, Wyoming
 Martin's Cove
 Mormon Row Historic District
 Mormon Trail
 Pacific Creek
 Rock Church (Auburn, Wyoming)
 South Pass
 Sweetwater River

References

Further reading
.

External links

 Newsroom (Wyoming)
 ComeUntoChrist.org Latter-day Saints Visitor site
 The Church of Jesus Christ of Latter-day Saints Official site

Latter Day Saint movement in Wyoming
Wyoming